Akeju is a surname. Notable people with the name include:

Akeju (singer) Nigerian singer, songwriter, and producer
Camille Akeju, American curator and educator

Yoruba-language surnames